Lady Abdullah Haroon (1886–1966), whose real name was Nusrat Khanum, was a socialite before the independence of Pakistan.

Life
Haroon was born in a Shia family in Iran, but later settled in Karachi, where in 1914 she was married local business man & politician Abdullah Haroon. 

She was also associated with a number of social organizations. She was elected as the President of all India Women Muslim League in 1943. She was the Vice-President of All Pakistan women's Association founded by Begum Ra'ana Liaquat Ali Khan in 1945.

See also
Abdullah Haroon
Hameed Haroon
Abdullah Hussain Haroon
Mahmoud Haroon
Yusuf Haroon

References

External links
 Lady Abdullah Haroon -Story of Pakistan

Iranian emigrants to India
Pakistani people of Iranian descent
Pakistani Shia Muslims
Pakistani socialites
People from Karachi
Lady Abdullah
1886 births
1966 deaths
People from British India